Martín Ramírez (born 8 August 1969) is a Peruvian footballer. He played in two matches for the Peru national football team from 1989 to 1991. He was also part of Peru's squad for the 1991 Copa América tournament.

References

External links
 

1969 births
Living people
Peruvian footballers
Peru international footballers
Place of birth missing (living people)
Association football defenders